My Neighbor's Wife is a surviving 1925 American silent comedy film directed by Clarence Geldart and starring E. K. Lincoln, Helen Ferguson and Herbert Rawlinson. It was released on a State's Rights by Davis Distributing Division.

Cast
E. K. Lincoln as Jack Newberry
Helen Ferguson as Florence Keaton
Edwards Davis as Mr. Keaton
Herbert Rawlinson as Allen Allwright
William Russell as Eric von Greed, film director
William Bailey as Greed's assistant
Chester Conklin as Cameraman
Tom Santschi as Inventor
Mildred Harris as Inventor's Wife
Douglas Gerrard as Bertie
Margaret Loomis as Kathlyn Jordan
Ralph Faulkner as William Jordan
Philippe De Lacy as William Jordan Jr.

Preservation status
The film is preserved at Cinematheque Quebecoise, Montreal.

References

External links

1925 films
American silent feature films
Films based on short fiction
American black-and-white films
Silent American comedy films
1925 comedy films
Films about filmmaking
Films based on works by James Oliver Curwood
1920s American films